Drepatelodes umbrillinea is a moth in the Apatelodidae family. It was described by Schaus in 1905. It is found in Mexico, Costa Rica and Peru.

References

Natural History Museum Lepidoptera generic names catalog

Apatelodidae
Moths described in 1905